Temocillin is a β-lactamase-resistant penicillin introduced by Beecham, marketed by Eumedica Pharmaceuticals as Negaban. It is used primarily for the treatment of multiple drug-resistant, Gram-negative bacteria.  
It is a  6-methoxy penicillin; it is also a carboxypenicillin.

Pharmacology
Temocillin is a β-lactamase-resistant penicillin.  It is not active against Gram-positive bacteria or bacteria with altered penicillin-binding proteins.

It is normally active against Moraxella catarrhalis, Brucella abortus, Burkholderia cepacia, Citrobacter species, Escherichia coli, Haemophilus influenzae, Klebsiella pneumoniae, Pasteurella multocida, Proteus mirabilis, Salmonella typhimurium, and Yersinia enterocolitica.  It is also active against some Enterobacter species, Morganella morganii, and Serratia species.  Temocillin has no useful activity against Acinetobacter species or Pseudomonas aeruginosa.

Its primary use is against Enterobacteriaceae, and in particular against strains producing extended-spectrum β-lactamase or AmpC β-lactamase.

Dosage
The common dose is 2 g intravenously every 12 hours and the high dose, notably in critically ill patients, is 2g every 8 hours. Theoretical reasons exist for giving temocillin as a continuous intravenous infusion in severe disease: a single loading dose of 2 g is given intravenously followed by a 4-g or 6-g infusion over 24 hours.  According to the SPC, chemical and physical in-use stability has been demonstrated for 24 hours at 25 °C for the following solvents: water for injection, physiological saline (0.9% sodium chloride), dextrose 5%, sodium chloride compound (Ringer's solution), Hartmann solution (sodium lactate compound + Ringer's lactate solution). 
Temocillin for intravenous injection is diluted in 10 to 20 ml of sterile water; it is diluted in less than 2 ml of sterile water when being prepared for intramuscular injection; the continuous infusion is diluted in 48 ml of sterile water for ease of administration (2 ml per hour).  To reduce pain, the intramuscular injection may be made up using sterile 1% lignocaine instead of sterile water.

Temocillin may be given to patients with impaired renal function after the dose has been adapted:

In case of intermittent high-flux hemodialysis: 1 g (I.V. injection) per 24 h of inter-dialytic session, preferably at the end of the hemodialysis (1 g q24 h, 2 g q48 h, 3 g q72 h).
In case of continuous peritoneal dialysis in ambulatory patients: 1 g every 24 hours.

No oral preparation of temocillin is licensed.

Adverse effects
The undesirable effects of temocillin are those of any β-lactam antibiotic.  In particular, it has been associated with angioedema and anaphylaxis in penicillin-allergic patients.  Animal studies have not shown any induction of Clostridium difficile infection.  As with any other penicillin, convulsions can occur if very high doses are given.

Synthesis

References

Further reading

Penicillins
Thiophenes